Hainanese curry rice is a Singaporean dish consisting of steamed white rice smothered in a mess of curries and gravy, characteristically accompanied by curry chicken, pork chop, chap chye (braised cabbage) and kong bak (braised pork). It originates in Singaporean cuisine and is not thought of as part of the cuisine of Hainan, China.

History
Hainanese curry rice developed during British colonial rule in Singapore. It was started by Hainanese living in Singapore, who were often employed by the British as well as the wealthy Peranakans (Straits-Chinese) as chefs in their homes. Pork chop was adapted from British cuisine and the rest of the ingredients, such as curry chicken, babi pongteh and chap chye, were from Peranakan cuisine. These were adapted for Hainanese curry rice. Loo's, one of the most well-known and popular Hainanese curry rice vendors in Singapore, started operations in 1946 and is situated opposite Tiong Bahru Market.

Description

Rice 
Traditionally, steamed white rice forms the base of this dish. In recent years, some outlets, for example Jin Soon Fa Curry Rice, offer brown rice as an option.

Curry 
The curry is milder and gloopier than its South Asian variant.

See also 
 Teochew porridge
 List of rice dishes

References

Singaporean cuisine
Chinese-Singaporean culture
Rice dishes
Southeast Asian curries
Curry dishes
Chinese cuisine outside China